The men's 10,000 metres track walk at the 1946 European Athletics Championships was held in Oslo, Norway, at Bislett Stadium.

Medalists

Results

Final

Participation
According to an unofficial count, 8 athletes from 5 countries participated in the event.

 (1)
 (2)
 (2)
 (2)
 (1)

References

10,000 metres track walk
Racewalking at the European Athletics Championships